Basil William Wellicome (28 December 1926 – 28 January 2016) was a British bobsledder who competed in the late 1940s. At the 1948 Winter Olympics in St. Moritz, he competed in the two-man event, but fell during the third run and did not finish.

References
1948 bobsleigh two-man results
British Olympic Association profile
Basil Wellicome's obituary

1926 births
2016 deaths
Olympic bobsledders of Great Britain
Bobsledders at the 1948 Winter Olympics
British male bobsledders